Anne-Marie Leduc (born 18 March 1937) is a French alpine skier. She competed in two events at the 1960 Winter Olympics.

References

1937 births
Living people
French female alpine skiers
Olympic alpine skiers of France
Alpine skiers at the 1960 Winter Olympics
Sportspeople from Vosges (department)